Lleyton Hewitt and Max Mirnyi defeated Ellis Ferreira and Rick Leach in the final, 6–4, 5–7, 7–6 to win the men's doubles tennis title at the 2000 US Open. It was their maiden major title.

Alex O'Brien and Sébastien Lareau were the defending champions but chose not to participate with each other. Sébastien partnered with Daniel Nestor, while Alex partnered with Jared Palmer. Both new pairings lost to Hewitt and Mirnyi, in the quarterfinals and semifinals, respectively.

This marked the last major appearance of former world No. 1 and 17-time major champion Mark Woodforde, and thus the last major appearance of the Woodies; they were defeated in the second round by Hewitt and Mirnyi.

Seeds
Champion seeds are indicated in bold text while text in italics indicates the round in which those seeds were eliminated.

Qualifying

Draw

Finals

Top half

Section 1

Section 2

Bottom half

Section 3

Section 4

References

External links
 Main draw
2000 US Open – Men's draws and results at the International Tennis Federation

Men's Doubles
US Open (tennis) by year – Men's doubles